Hringur Jóhannesson (December 21, 1932 – July 17, 1996) was an Icelandic painter. He had his first art exhibition in 1962. 

Hringur held 40 exhibitions and 70 group art exhibitions in Iceland and abroad. He also worked as an art teacher from 1952 to 1962. He illustrated many newspapers and magazines as well. 

Hringur died at the Landspítali hospital in Reykjavik.

References

External links
Biography

1932 births
1996 deaths
Hringur Jóhannesson
Hringur Jóhannesson
Male painters